Annie Brobst (born May 11, 1985) is a country music singer-songwriter from Ohio.

Biography 
Brobst was born in Columbus, Ohio. After moving to Boston, Massachusetts in 2007, she self-released one EP titled Ghost. She then moved to Salem, Mass where she taught Spanish at a charter school. She won an award for best female country singer in her district. Brobst released her second album, My First Rodeo, in 2018. She now sings as her career with her most popular song reaching 5,000 views. Brobst released her latest album, Holler & Swaller, in March 2021.

Discography

Albums

References 

Living people
American country singer-songwriters
American women country singers
Singer-songwriters from Ohio
1983 births
21st-century American women singers
Country musicians from Ohio